The Navigator is a Norton motorcycle made from 1960 to 1965, based on the Norton Jubilee 250 cc. Production ceased shortly before the collapse of the parent group Associated Motor Cycles in 1966.

Development
Launched in 1960 at the Earls Court Motorcycle Show the Navigator was a development of the Norton Jubilee. The engine was enlarged in bore (from 60 to 63mm) and stroke (from 44 to 56mm), to give a capacity of 349cc. The cylinders, separate on the Jubilee, were now a single casting to improve oil retention, but the cylinder heads continued to be separate.
Norton Roadholder forks and eight-inch brakes were fitted to replace the Jubilee's lightweight front end. The down tube on the frame was stiffened to improve handling and deal with the power increase to 22bhp. 

The 1960 model was still aimed at the Jubilee market, with  enclosed rear end. In 1961, optional extras included a handlebar-mounted fairing and screen, as well as large legshields and panniers, giving it the enclosed look popular at the time. Early Navigators came with two-tone paintwork in grey and black for the "De Luxe" and grey and blue for the "Standard" model. From October 1962, the Standard's colour options were changed to black and polychromatic blue, with black seats with white piping.

When Norton production moved to Plumstead in 1963, production of the De Luxe ended, but the Standard model continued with wider front forks and a steering lock, until Navigator production ended in 1965 with the collapse of Norton's parent group, Associated Motor Cycles.

Norton Electra
The Norton Electra was essentially a Norton Navigator bored out to 383cc with an electric start that drove the crankshaft by a chain inside an extended crankcase.  Launched in 1963, the Electra also had upgraded 12v electrics to supply power to the starter, handlebar-end direction indicators and heavyweight rear brake. The bike was instigated by the Berliner Motor Corporation and was the first Norton to be produced at the Plumstead, London Associated Motor Cycles plant. The Electra's unreliable starting, heavy fuel consumption and engine vibration resulted in poor sales. The model was dropped in 1965 after just two years of production.

References

External links
 Norton Navigator review

Navigator
Motorcycles introduced in 1960
Motorcycles powered by straight-twin engines